Anama may refer to:

Places
 Anama, New Zealand, a sparsely populated locality in the Canterbury region of the South Island
 Anama, South Australia, a locality and historic pastoral run in the Mid North region
 Anamã, a municipality in the Brazilian state of Amazonas
 Anamoq also known as Anama, a village in East Azerbaijan Province, Iran
 Krabozavodskoye, a village formerly known as Anama on the island of Shikotan in the Kuril Islands

Other uses
 Anama (beetle), a genus of beetles in the family Cerambycidae
 ANAMA, the Azerbaijan National Agency for Mine Action
 AnamA, a Brazilian metal band